"You Turn Me On (Like a Radio)" is a song written by Bob McDill and Jim Weatherly, and recorded by American country music artist Ed Bruce.  It was released in October 1984 as the first single from his album Homecoming.  The song reached number 3 on the Billboard Hot Country Singles chart.

Chart performance

References

1984 singles
Ed Bruce songs
Songs written by Bob McDill
Songs written by Jim Weatherly
RCA Records singles
1984 songs